The North Umpqua Trail is a multi-use trail open for hiking, mountain biking and horse-back riding that follows the North Umpqua River in Southern Oregon, United States.

Route 
The North Umpqua Trail is a designated National Recreation Trail and follows the North Umpqua River as it winds west out of the Cascades and towards the city of Roseburg, Oregon. The trail is inside the Roseburg District BLM and Umpqua National Forest lands and closely follows the river for most of its length. It has been designated by the International Mountain Biking Association as an 'Epic Ride', an honor bestowed on only a handful of trails around the world.

References

External links

North Umpqua Trail Brochure

Hiking trails in Oregon
Protected areas of Douglas County, Oregon
Umpqua National Forest
Long-distance trails in the United States